Talkhab-e Hamzeh Ali (also Romanized as Talkhāb-e Ḩamzeh ‘Alī) is a village in Kushk Rural District, Abezhdan District, Andika County, Khuzestan Province, Iran. At the 2006 census, its population was 101, in 18 families.

References 

Populated places in Andika County